Yule Bay is a bay indenting the coast of northern Victoria Land between Cape Hooker and Cape Dayman. An inner (western) portion of the bay is circumscribed by Bates Point and Ackroyd Point. In 2020 a penguin colony has been sighted at the bay.

References 

Bays of Victoria Land
Pennell Coast